Trinity Christian School is a private, classical Christian school located in Montville, New Jersey. It is "committed to the education of children in a Biblical and classical framework with a view to presenting facts in the light of God's truth." Trinity Christian School (TCS) includes Elementary (K-6) and Secondary (7-12) grades.

The school has been accredited by the Middle States Association of Colleges and Schools Commission on Elementary and Secondary Schools since 2015 and its accreditation expires in May 2022. It is a member of Association of Christian Schools International, Association of Classical and Christian Schools, New Jersey Christian School Association and the Metro Christian Athletic Association.

As of the 2017–18 school year, the school had an enrollment of 156 students and 17.9 classroom teachers (on an FTE basis), for a student–teacher ratio of 8.7:1. The school's student body was 67.3% (105) White, 17.3% (27) Hispanic, 5.8% (9) Asian, 4.5% (7) Black and 3.2% (5) two or more races.

External links

References 

1986 establishments in New Jersey
Christian schools in New Jersey
Educational institutions established in 1986
Montville, New Jersey
Private elementary schools in New Jersey
Private high schools in Morris County, New Jersey
Private middle schools in New Jersey
Classical Christian schools